Thomas J. McInerney (June 12, 1924 – August 5, 1998) was an American politician who served in the New York State Assembly from 1965 to 1972 and from 1977 to 1978.

References

1924 births
1998 deaths
Democratic Party members of the New York State Assembly
20th-century American politicians
People from Yonkers, New York